The Diehls Covered Bridge, also known as Turner's Bridge, is a historic wooden covered bridge located at Harrison Township in Bedford County, Pennsylvania. It crosses the Raystown Branch Juniata River. It is one of 15 historic covered bridges in Bedford County.

It was listed on the National Register of Historic Places in 1980.

Popular Culture
Diehl's Bridge is featured in the opening scenes of the anthology Television series that was created by George Romero, Tales From The Darkside.

See also
List of bridges documented by the Historic American Engineering Record in Pennsylvania

References

External links

Covered bridges on the National Register of Historic Places in Pennsylvania
Covered bridges in Bedford County, Pennsylvania
Bridges completed in 1892
Wooden bridges in Pennsylvania
Bridges in Bedford County, Pennsylvania
Historic American Engineering Record in Pennsylvania
National Register of Historic Places in Bedford County, Pennsylvania
Road bridges on the National Register of Historic Places in Pennsylvania
Burr Truss bridges in the United States